Acid Bath is the second studio album by English gothic rock band Alien Sex Fiend, released in 1984 by Anagram Records. It was produced by Kevin Armstrong.

Reception 
Trouser Press described the album as "an inspired dose of mesmerizing, brain-frying insanity".

Track listing

Personnel
Alien Sex Fiend
Nik Fiend – bass, tape sampling, vocals
Yaxi – guitars, bass
Mrs. Fiend – keyboards, synthesizers, piano
Johnnie Ha-Ha – drums, percussion, drum programming

References

External links 

 

Alien Sex Fiend albums
1984 albums